Ingrid van Biezen (born 1969) is Professor of Comparative Politics at Leiden University, and the editor of the political science journal Acta Politica.

Her research interests include comparative European politics, political parties and party systems in Europe, democratisation, Southern Europe, and post-communist politics.

Education 
Ingrid van Biezen studied for her masters and her PhD at Leiden University.

Career 
From 2000 to 2009 she was based in the Department of Political Science and International Studies at the University of Birmingham.

She is currently directing a large comparative research project (Re-conceptualizing democracy) on political parties and democracy through a focus on party law. The project is funded by the European Research Council.

Bibliography

Books

Journal articles

Notes

External links
Homepage at Leiden University

1969 births
Living people
Dutch political scientists
Academics of the University of Birmingham
Leiden University alumni
Academic staff of Leiden University
People from Leiden
Women political scientists